The intelligence commissioner of Canada is an independent officer of the Government of Canada charged with quasi-judicial review of the two most biggest intelligence agencies, the Canadian Security Intelligence Service (CSIS) and the Communications Security Establishment (CSE) – before the agencies engage in certain espionage activities. 

The intelligence commissioner heads the Office of the Intelligence Commissioner of Canada, the agency which supports the work of the commissioner. The position is a Governor in Council appointment made on the advice of the prime minister of Canada. The commissioner is accountable to the Parliament of Canada through the prime minister, who receives an annual report from the commissioner and tables it in the House of Commons.

The inaugural intelligence commissioner of Canada is Jean-Pierre Plouffe, who took office on July 12, 2019 and served until October 1, 2022. The present intelligence commissioner of Canada is Simon Noël, who took office on October 1, 2022.

Background 
The office was established as part of the National Security Act, 2017, an omnibus bill introduced by the Trudeau government which reworked many of the existing mechanisms within the intelligence community in Canada, including oversight of intelligence gathering and any actions taken by intelligence agencies on behalf of the Government of Canada.

Accountability 
The intelligence commissioner issues a report on their activity to the prime minister annually who must table it in Parliament after removing confidential and classified information. The commissioner is entitled to receive all reports which are compiled by the National Security and Intelligence Review Agency (NSIRA).

List of intelligence commissioners of Canada

References

External links 
 

Federal departments and agencies of Canada
Officers of the Parliament of Canada